Mani Iyer is a surname. Notable people with the surname include:

Palghat Mani Iyer (1912–1981), Indian musician
Madurai Mani Iyer (1912–1968), Indian singer
Priya Vasudev Mani Iyer (born 1984), Indian actress and model

Compound surnames